This is the list of airports served by MexicanaClick scheduled flights. It does not include cities only served by Mexicana and MexicanaLink :
On August 31 all destinations were SUSPENDED until new notice.
Cuba
Havana - José Martí International Airport
Mexico
Baja California
Mexicali - General Rodolfo Sánchez Taboada International Airport
Tijuana - General Abelardo L. Rodríguez International Airport
Baja California Sur
San José del Cabo - Los Cabos International Airport
Campeche
Ciudad del Carmen - Ciudad del Carmen International Airport
Chiapas
Tuxtla Gutiérrez - Angel Albino Corzo International Airport
Chihuahua
Chihuahua - General Roberto Fierro Villalobos International Airport
Federal District
Mexico City - Mexico City International Airport Hub
Guanajuato
León - Del Bajío International Airport
Guerrero
Acapulco - General Juan N. Álvarez International Airport
Ixtapa-Zihuatanejo - Ixtapa-Zihuatanejo International Airport
Jalisco
Guadalajara - Don Miguel Hidalgo y Costilla International Airport
Puerto Vallarta - Lic. Gustavo Díaz Ordaz International Airport
Nuevo León
Monterrey - Mariano Escobedo International Airport
Oaxaca
Huatulco - Bahías de Huatulco International Airport
Oaxaca - Xoxocotlán International Airport
Puerto Escondido - Puerto Escondido International Airport
Quintana Roo
Chetumal - Chetumal International Airport
Cozumel - Cozumel International Airport
San Luis Potosí
San Luis Potosí - Ponciano Arriaga International Airport
Sinaloa
Culiacán - Federal de Bachigualato International Airport
Mazatlán - General Rafael Buelna International Airport
Tabasco
Villahermosa - Carlos Rovirosa Pérez International Airport
Tamaulipas
Nuevo Laredo - Quetzalcóatl International Airport
Reynosa - General Lucio Blanco International Airport
Tampico - General Francisco Javier Mina International Airport
Veracruz
Veracruz - General Heriberto Jara International Airport
Minatitlán/Coatzacoalcos - Minatitlán/Coatzacoalcos National Airport
Yucatán
Mérida - Manuel Crescencio Rejón International Airport

Terminated destinations
Mexico - Saltillo

References

Notes 

Lists of airline destinations